The 1995 NASCAR Winston Cup Series was the 47th season of professional stock car racing in the United States and the 24th modern-era Cup series season. The season began on February 12 in Daytona Beach and concluded on November 12 at the Atlanta Motor Speedway. Jeff Gordon of Hendrick Motorsports won his first career championship.

Overview 
The major story heading into the 1995 season was Dale Earnhardt's attempt to make history. After winning his seventh Winston Cup Championship in 1994, Earnhardt tied Richard Petty's record for Cup Championships. Going into the 1995 season, Earnhardt had won four of the last five Winston Cup points titles, and was considered the favorite to win his eighth in 1995.

As the season progressed, the race for the series championship became a battle between Earnhardt, Sterling Marlin and Jeff Gordon. The majority of the spotlight soon shifted on the 24-year-old Gordon. Gordon, who had won two of 1994’s biggest races (Coca-Cola 600 and the Inaugural Brickyard 400), visited victory lane in three of the first six races of 1995.
Gordon would become the most consistent driver of the season. During one stretch of the season, he rattled off 14 straight top ten finishes, winning four times during that stretch. Despite a late season challenge by Earnhardt, Gordon would win the season’s championship by 34 points. In doing so, he became the youngest Winston Cup Champion of the modern era (post 1971). Gordon made light of this at the season ending banquet, toasting Earnhardt with a glass of milk instead of champagne.

However, there were several other major stories in 1995.
1995 saw the Lumina, which had been Chevrolet's official car in NASCAR since the 1989 Winston 500, being replaced by the new Chevrolet Monte Carlo. The Monte Carlo would prove to be the dominant car in 1995, winning 21 of the season's 31 races. After winning each of the season's first seven races, NASCAR gave advantages to the two other makes: Ford and Pontiac.
In contrast to its GM counterpart, Pontiac continued to struggle. The manufacturer won only twice in 1995, and did not have a single driver in the top ten in points (12th place Michael Waltrip was the highest).
Goodyear was the sole tire supplier in 1995, after winning the "tire war" against Hoosier. Despite three wins in 1994 with driver/owner Geoff Bodine, Hoosier decided to leave NASCAR after the 1994 season. Its reasoning, according to Hoosier president Bob Newton, was "to concentrate our efforts in short track racing, which remains our bread and butter."

1995 changes 
Robert Yates Racing: After a practice crash at Michigan International Speedway in August 1994, Ernie Irvan spent the rest of the 1994 season recuperating from his injuries. While Irvan continued to make great progress in his recovery, it was becoming clear that he would have to sit out the 1995 season. Thus, RYR began to search for a new driver to take over the #28 Ford. After securing a buyout from his contract at Joe Gibbs Racing, it was announced that Dale Jarrett would be the driver for 1995.
Joe Gibbs Racing: After the departure of Dale Jarrett, Joe Gibbs Racing was forced to find a new driver for the #18 Chevy. With encouragement from General Motors, JGR signed Bobby Labonte, who left Bill Davis Racing,
Elliott-Hardy Racing: After struggling the last two years driving for Junior Johnson, Bill Elliott formed his own team for 1995, sharing ownership with Georgia businessman Charles Hardy. Elliott would reunite with brothers Ernie and Dan, with whom he had great success during his time at Melling Racing. Elliott selected 94 as the number for his Ford and McDonald's as his sponsor. The number had been used by Bill's nephew Casey Elliott, before Casey was diagnosed with cancer (Casey would ultimately lose his battle with the disease in 1996).
Junior Johnson: For 1995, Johnson was forced to look for new drivers and sponsors for both of his cars. Budweiser, the long time sponsor of the #11, left to sponsor the #25 at Hendrick Motorsports and Bill Elliott took the sponsor of the #27, McDonald's, to his new team. For the #11 team, Johnson replaced driver Elliott with Brett Bodine and got sponsorship from Lowe's. For the #27 car, sophomore Loy Allen Jr. took over for Jimmy Spencer with sponsorship from Hooters. Before the April Bristol race, Allen left the team. Various drivers drove the #27 for the rest of 1995; the majority of starts went to veteran Busch Series driver Elton Sawyer.
King Racing: Bodine would be replaced by sprint car legend Steve Kinser. Kinser, who had won 14 World of Outlaws championships, had limited exposure to stock car racing; his only experience had been in the IROC series. After failing to qualify for the spring races at Bristol and North Wilkesboro, Kinser and the team mutually split. Kinser returned to the WoO series, while Hut Stricklin was hired to replace him in the 26 car.
Larry Hedrick Motorsports: LHM was left without a driver and sponsor for 1995. Former Busch Grand National Series Champion Joe Nemechek left to start his own team, Rookie Ricky Craven would drive the #41 Chevy. Craven won the Rookie of the Year award in 1995.
Diamond Ridge Motorsports: Former Busch Grand National champ Steve Grissom would return for a second Cup season. 
NEMCO Motorsports: As he had done en route to the 1992 Busch Grand National Series Championship, Joe Nemechek formed his own team in 1995.
Leo Jackson Motorsports: Harry Gant called it a career after the 1994 season. BGN series regular Robert Pressley would replace Gant in the Skoal Bandit Chevy, and would also compete for Rookie of the Year for 1995.
Bill Davis Racing: BDR found itself in a similar position to many teams, needing to replace both a driver (Bobby Labonte) and a sponsor. BDR hoped to find success with manufacturer Pontiac with driver Randy LaJoie. However, the combo experienced lackluster results, and LaJoie was fired in July. After going through several drivers, Davis settled on Ward Burton, who had been let go from the Alan Dillard Jr. owned team earlier in the year. Burton shocked the stock car world by winning his first career Cup Series race at the North Carolina Motor Speedway in October. LaJoie would also find success, winning the Busch Grand National Title in 1996 and 1997.
Melling Racing: After running part-time for the last three seasons, Melling returned to full-time competition in 1995. Mississippian Lake Speed was hired to be driver and general manager of the team.
Bud Moore: After Lake Speed left the team at the end of 1994, Bud Moore hired short track legend (and Sportscenter favorite) Dick Trickle to drive the #15 Ford.
Travis Carter Motorsports: After struggling during the 1994 season, the team parted ways with driver Hut Stricklin. He would be replaced by Jimmy Spencer, who had won two races driving for Junior Johnson in 1994.
Petty Enterprises: John Andretti, who had replaced Wally Dallenbach Jr. midway through 1994, did not return in 1995. Replacing Andretti would be Tennessee driver Bobby Hamilton.
SABCO Racing: After Hamilton left for Petty Enterprises, owner Felix Sabates hired Greg Sacks to drive the #40 Pontiac. After a dismal 14-race stint, Sacks was let go. Several drivers took the reins of the #40, with most of the duties going to Rich Bickle. Sabates' other car, the #42 driven by Kyle Petty, had new colors for 1995.
Jasper Motorsports: Owner D. K. Ulrich hired veteran open wheel and sports car driver Davy Jones to pilot the #77 Ford. Bobby Hillin Jr. replaced Jones beginning at the June Dover race.
Kranefuss-Haas Racing: After racing part-time in 1994, the team co-owned by Michael Kranefuss and Carl Haas went full-time in 1995. Former CART driver John Andretti was selected to drive the #37 Ford.

Teams and drivers

Complete schedule

Limited schedule

Schedule

Races

Busch Clash 

The 1995 Busch Clash, kicked off the season on February 12, at Daytona International Speedway. Geoff Bodine drew the pole. As an exhibition race, no points are awarded. The race was between 1994 Winston Cup pole winners. Also, in a first for the event, the driver who collected the most poles in the 1994 Busch Season was also invited. This honor went to David Green.

Dale Earnhardt got the season off to a dominating start, leading 18 of 20 laps to collect his 6th Clash win. Aside from that, the most noteworthy event happened on the first lap, when Loy Allen Jr. made contact with Greg Sacks in turn 3, sending Sacks into the wall. Sacks also collected Mark Martin, ending Martin's day. Sterling Marlin finished second, Bill Elliott was third. Jeff Gordon and Todd Bodine rounded out the top five.

Gatorade 125s 

The Gatorade 125s, the qualifying races for the Daytona 500, were held on Thursday, February 16, at Daytona International Speedway. The lineups for the 125s were determined by qualifying the previous Sunday. The first race would consist of drivers who qualified in odd-numbered positions (1st fastest, 3rd fastest, 5th fastest, etc.), while the second race would be formed from even-numbered qualifiers. As the fastest driver, Dale Jarrett would start from the pole in the first race, and second-fastest driver Dale Earnhardt would lead the field in the second race.

Sterling Marlin would dominate the first race, leading 44 of 50 laps. His victory would ensure the 1994 Daytona 500 winner the 3rd starting spot on Sunday. Good finishes for Dave Marcis (10th), Joe Nemechek (12th), and Joe Ruttman (14th) assured them spots in the 500.

In race 2, Earnhardt made it two-for-two for his Speedweeks, edging out Jeff Gordon for the victory. The race also contained two crashes. The first, on lap 15, collected Jimmy Spencer, Billy Standridge, and Loy Allen Jr. Allen was forced to fall back on his qualifying time, while Spencer and Standridge went home. The second crash occurred on lap 42, and involved Chad Little, Phil Barkdoll, Phil Parsons, and Jim Sauter. Fortunately for Parsons, his qualifying time was good enough to get him into the 500. Little, Barkdoll, and Sauter weren't so lucky, and all three were forced to watch the 500 on TV.

Daytona 500 

The 1995 Daytona 500 was held February 19 at Daytona International Speedway. Dale Jarrett won his first career Winston Cup pole.

Top ten results

 4-Sterling Marlin
 3-Dale Earnhardt
 6-Mark Martin
 16-Ted Musgrave
 28-Dale Jarrett
 30-Michael Waltrip
 29-Steve Grissom
 5-Terry Labonte
 25-Ken Schrader
 21-Morgan Shepherd

Failed to qualify: 20-Bobby Hillin Jr., 40-Greg Sacks, 14-Randy MacDonald, 95-Doug Heveron, 82-Terry Byers, 52-Gary Bradberry, 62-Ronnie Sanders, 81-Kenny Wallace, 73-Phil Barkdoll, 99-Shawna Robinson, 72-Jim Sauter, 51-Kerry Teague, 97-Chad Little, 68-Bob Strait, 23-Jimmy Spencer, 0-Delma Cowart, 47-Billy Standridge, 67-Ken Bouchard, 48-James Hylton, 53-Ritchie Petty, 32-Mike Chase, 65-Steve Seligman

As of 2022, Sterling Marlin is the only driver in NASCAR history to score his first 2 career wins in the Daytona 500.
Sterling Marlin becomes the last driver until 2020, a driver to win back-to-back Daytona 500 races (1994 & 1995), joining Richard Petty (1973 & 1974) and Cale Yarborough (1983 & 1984). Denny Hamlin would also accomplish the feat, winning the Daytona 500 in 2019 and 2020.

Goodwrench 500 

The Goodwrench 500 was held February 26 at North Carolina Speedway. Jeff Gordon won the pole.

Top ten results

 24-Jeff Gordon
 18-Bobby Labonte
 3-Dale Earnhardt
 10-Ricky Rudd
 28-Dale Jarrett, 1 lap down
 29-Steve Grissom, 1 lap down
 6-Mark Martin, 2 laps down
 12-Derrike Cope, 3 laps down
 31-Ward Burton, 3 laps down
 42-Kyle Petty, 3 laps down

Failed to qualify (in order of speeds): 66-Ben Hess, 52-Gary Bradberry, 48-James Hylton, 47-Billy Standridge, 19-Phil Parsons

This was the last 500-mile race at Rockingham.

Ernie Irvan made his NASCAR return at this race but not in a driving role; he was in the TV booth as a color analyst for TNN's live flag to flag coverage.

Pontiac Excitement 400 

The Pontiac Excitement 400 was held March 5 at Richmond International Raceway. Jeff Gordon won the pole.

Top ten results

 5-Terry Labonte
 3-Dale Earnhardt
 2-Rusty Wallace
 25-Ken Schrader
 4-Sterling Marlin
 12-Derrike Cope
 17-Darrell Waltrip
 6-Mark Martin, 1 lap down
 43-Bobby Hamilton, 1 lap down
 37-John Andretti, 1 lap down

Failed to qualify: 32-Jimmy Hensley, 81-Kenny Wallace, 47-Billy Standridge, 78-Jay Hedgecock, 29-Steve Grissom, 52-Gary Bradberry, 66-Ben Hess, 49-Eric Smith, 77-Davy Jones
Steve Grissom entered this race 5th in points after back-to-back top 10s, but failed to qualify based on points from 1994.

Purolator 500 

The Purolator 500 was held March 12 at Atlanta Motor Speedway. Dale Earnhardt won the pole.

Top ten results

 24-Jeff Gordon
 18-Bobby Labonte
 5-Terry Labonte
 3-Dale Earnhardt
 28-Dale Jarrett, 1 lap down
 21-Morgan Shepherd, 1 lap down
 4-Sterling Marlin, 1 lap down
 10-Ricky Rudd, 1 lap down
 6-Mark Martin, 2 laps down
 2-Rusty Wallace, 2 laps down

Failed to qualify: 31-Ward Burton, 52-Gary Bradberry, 27-Loy Allen Jr., 67-Ken Bouchard, 76-Johnny Chapman, 66-Ben Hess, 81-Kenny Wallace, 78-Pancho Carter

Before the field even took the green, Mike Wallace got turned into the inside wall on the frontstretch, damaging his car before he even got a chance to race on green. It led to him completing only 33 laps, finishing 40th due to engine failure from the crash.
Jeremy Mayfield, Michael Waltrip and Jeff Purvis were involved in a vicious crash on the backstretch on lap 144. Mayfield got turned head-on into the wall off of turn 2 so hard, the rear tires came off the ground. When he came off the wall, the car was running straight down the backstretch but he had no brakes or steering, and he veered up towards the wall again right in front of Waltrip and Purvis and got t-boned extremely hard.

TranSouth Financial 400 

The TranSouth Financial 400 was held March 26 at Darlington Raceway. Jeff Gordon won the pole.

Top ten results

 4-Sterling Marlin
 3-Dale Earnhardt
 16-Ted Musgrave
 75-Todd Bodine
 12-Derrike Cope
 29-Steve Grissom
 30-Michael Waltrip
 21-Morgan Shepherd
 43-Bobby Hamilton
 37-John Andretti, 1 lap down

Failed to qualify: 81-Kenny Wallace, 52-Brad Teague, 19-Phil Parsons

This was the first race at Darlington after the Lady in Black was freshly paved for the first time in decades. Speeds were high and the cars gripped extremely well in the corners, leading to many drivers driving over their heads. There were many accidents as a result.
Jeff Gordon, who led most laps by far, was involved in a crash on lap 201.
This was Sterling Marlin's first win on a non-restrictor plate track

Food City 500 

The Food City 500 was held April 2 at Bristol International Raceway. Mark Martin won the pole.

Top ten results

 24-Jeff Gordon
 2-Rusty Wallace
 17-Darrell Waltrip
 43-Bobby Hamilton
 10-Ricky Rudd
 28-Dale Jarrett
 5-Terry Labonte, 1 lap down
 6-Mark Martin, 1 lap down
 4-Sterling Marlin, 1 lap down
 33-Robert Pressley, 2 laps down

Failed to qualify: 98-Jeremy Mayfield, 87-Joe Nemechek, 26-Steve Kinser,
47-Billy Standridge, 78-Hut Stricklin, 66-Butch Miller, 52-Brad Teague, 27-Loy Allen Jr., 90-Mike Wallace

This was the last ever Top 3 finish for Darrell Waltrip.

First Union 400 

The First Union 400 was held April 9 at North Wilkesboro Speedway. Jeff Gordon won the pole.

Top ten results

 3-Dale Earnhardt
 24-Jeff Gordon
 6-Mark Martin
 2-Rusty Wallace
 29-Steve Grissom
 16-Ted Musgrave, 1 lap down
 4-Sterling Marlin, 1 lap down
 1-Rick Mast, 1 lap down
 11-Brett Bodine, 1 lap down
 17-Darrell Waltrip, 2 laps down

Failed to qualify: 98-Jeremy Mayfield,
81-Kenny Wallace, 32-Chuck Bown, 78-Jay Hedgecock, 77-Davy Jones, 47-Billy Standridge, 27-Jeff Purvis, 26-Steve Kinser, 52-Randy MacDonald
Steve Grissom re-entered the top 10 in points after his DNQ at Richmond.
Final NASCAR race for sprint car legend Steve Kinser.

Hanes 500 

The Hanes 500 was held April 23 at Martinsville Speedway. Bobby Labonte won the pole.

Top ten results

 2-Rusty Wallace
 16-Ted Musgrave
 24-Jeff Gordon
 17-Darrell Waltrip
 6-Mark Martin
 25-Ken Schrader
 28-Dale Jarrett
 43-Bobby Hamilton
 42-Kyle Petty, 1 lap down
 18-Bobby Labonte, 1 lap down

Failed to qualify: 75-Todd Bodine, 23-Jimmy Spencer, 32-Chuck Bown,
78-Jay Hedgecock, 8-Jeff Burton, 22-Randy LaJoie, 77-Davy Jones

This race was shortened to 356 laps due to a combination of a long red flag for rain, and darkness. Starting in 2017 the track had a full lighting system installed to allow night racing insuring a race would never be called for darkness again.

Winston Select 500 

The Winston Select 500 was held April 30 at Talladega Superspeedway. The #5 of Terry Labonte won the pole.

Top ten results

 6-Mark Martin
 24-Jeff Gordon
 21-Morgan Shepherd
 17-Darrell Waltrip
 18-Bobby Labonte
 94-Bill Elliott
 7-Geoff Bodine
 75-Todd Bodine
 23-Jimmy Spencer
 19-Loy Allen Jr.

Failed to qualify: 53-Ritchie Petty, 47-Billy Standridge, 87-Joe Nemechek, 65-Steve Seligman, 0-Delma Cowart
This was Loy Allen Jr.'s only top 10 finish in NASCAR Winston Cup Series racing.
Dale Earnhardt was leading the race with two laps to go, but was passed by Mark Martin in the tri-oval coming to the white flag and spun around by Morgan Shepherd exiting turn 2 on the last lap. The car lifted over a foot but roof flaps prevented the car getting airborne. Earnhardt managed to save the car and drove it to a 21st-place finish.
Loy Allen Jr. finished 10th after leading several laps and driving what was arguably the best race of his Cup career.

Save Mart Supermarkets 300 

The Save Mart Supermarkets 300 was held May 7 at Sears Point Raceway. Ricky Rudd won the pole.

Top ten results

 3-Dale Earnhardt
 6-Mark Martin
 24-Jeff Gordon
 10-Ricky Rudd
 5-Terry Labonte
 16-Ted Musgrave
 4-Sterling Marlin
 75-Todd Bodine
 25-Ken Schrader
 30-Michael Waltrip

Failed to qualify: 40-Greg Sacks, 98-Jeremy Mayfield, 27-Elton Sawyer, 00w-Scott Gaylord, 64-Garrett Evans, 22w-St. James Davis, 19-Ernie Cope

This was Dale Earnhardt's only career road course victory in Winston Cup competition. Coming to the white flag, Mark Martin hit oil and Earnhardt drove by him, took the lead and held off Martin for the victory (Martin had dominated the race).
Dale Jarrett got up on his side in a crash on lap 62 trying to avoid a wreck between Rusty Wallace and Davy Jones. However, the marshals pushed him back on 4 wheels, and he finished the race in 23rd, on the lead lap.

Coca-Cola 600 

The Coca-Cola 600 was held May 28 at Charlotte Motor Speedway. The #24 of Jeff Gordon won the pole.

Top ten results

 18-Bobby Labonte
 5-Terry Labonte
 30-Michael Waltrip
 4-Sterling Marlin, 1 lap down
 10-Ricky Rudd, 1 lap down
 3-Dale Earnhardt, 1 lap down
 26-Hut Stricklin, 1 lap down
 9-Lake Speed, 2 laps down
 43-Bobby Hamilton, 2 laps down
 41-Ricky Craven, 3 laps down

Failed to qualify: 40-Greg Sacks, 20-Bobby Hillin Jr., 95-Jimmy Hensley, 77-Davy Jones, 44-Jeff Purvis, 67-Johnny Chapman

Jimmy Hensley relieved Darrell Waltrip during this race because of the injuries that Waltrip suffered the previous Saturday night during The Winston.
This was Bobby Labonte's first NASCAR Winston Cup win.

Miller Genuine Draft 500 

The Miller Genuine Draft 500 was held June 4 at Dover Downs International Speedway. Jeff Gordon won the pole.

Top ten results

 42-Kyle Petty
 18-Bobby Labonte
 16-Ted Musgrave
 26-Hut Stricklin
 3-Dale Earnhardt
 24-Jeff Gordon, 1 lap down
 4-Sterling Marlin, 1 lap down
 30-Michael Waltrip, 1 lap down
 2-Rusty Wallace, 1 lap down
 87-Joe Nemechek, 1 lap down

Failed to qualify: 79-Doug French, 19-Loy Allen Jr.

This was the first race at Dover after the track's surface had been changed from asphalt to concrete.
This race was marred by "The Big One," a 20 car crash on lap 2 coming out of turn 4. Usually, these occur only during restrictor plate races, but they have been known to occur at Dover.
This was Kyle Petty's 8th and final NASCAR Winston Cup win. He started 37th and avoided the early carnage to lead 271 of the 500 laps (54.2%).
In addition to this race marking Kyle Petty's last victory; this would be the first win for Pontiac since the 1993 Hooters 500; when Rusty Wallace took the checkered flag in the last race before Team Penske switched from Pontiac to Ford starting in 1994.

UAW-GM Teamwork 500 

The UAW-GM Teamwork 500 was held June 11 at Pocono Raceway. Ken Schrader won the pole.

Top ten results

 5-Terry Labonte
 16-Ted Musgrave
 25-Ken Schrader
 4-Sterling Marlin
 26-Hut Stricklin
 94-Bill Elliott
 21-Morgan Shepherd
 3-Dale Earnhardt
 30-Michael Waltrip
 11-Brett Bodine

Failed to qualify: 79-Doug French

Terry Labonte made the pass for the win on the final restart with 7 laps to go, when teammate Jeff Gordon missed the upshift from 2nd to 3rd gear. When that happened, the entire line of lead-lap cars swept to the left and passed Gordon. At that time, restarts in the final 10 laps were single file, with all of the cars one or more laps down lining up directly behind the lead-lap cars. Gordon ended up finishing 16th, last car on the lead lap. Those were the only laps Labonte led in the race.
Jimmy Horton, driving the #27 Ford in place of Elton Sawyer (who competed in the Busch Series race at Myrtle Beach the previous night), climbed out of the car in the first half after being overcome by fumes. Jimmy Spencer (who ironically ran that same car the year before), who had parked his #23 Ford earlier because of engine problems, took over in relief. Spencer took the #27 to a 34th-place finish, 8 laps down.

Miller Genuine Draft 400 

The Miller Genuine Draft 400 was held June 18 at Michigan International Speedway. Jeff Gordon won the pole.

Top ten results

 18-Bobby Labonte
 24-Jeff Gordon
 2-Rusty Wallace
 37-John Andretti
 21-Morgan Shepherd
 28-Dale Jarrett
 4-Sterling Marlin
 6-Mark Martin
 5-Terry Labonte
 16-Ted Musgrave

Failed to qualify: 88-Gary Bradberry, 40-Greg Sacks

Late in the race, the #9 of Lake Speed (who finished 11th) accidentally pinched the #30 of Michael Waltrip (who finished 12th) into the wall. Waltrip took exception to this move and confronted Speed on pit road after the race. He ended up throwing a couple of punches through the driver's side window of Speed's Spam Ford. Waltrip would be fined $10,000 by NASCAR for the incident.

Pepsi 400 

The Pepsi 400 was held July 1 at Daytona International Speedway. Dale Earnhardt won the pole.

Top ten results

 24-Jeff Gordon
 4-Sterling Marlin
 3-Dale Earnhardt
 6-Mark Martin
 16-Ted Musgrave
 25-Ken Schrader
 42-Kyle Petty
 10-Ricky Rudd
 23-Jimmy Spencer
 94-Bill Elliott

Failed to qualify: 81-Kenny Wallace, 0-Delma Cowart, 65-Steve Seligman

The race ended on an unusual 1 lap shootout.
Benny Parsons, ESPN's announcer, joked about Gordon, who was leading on the final restart saying that he "took shifting lessons" because of Gordon's mistake on the last race at Pocono.
Kyle Petty finished seventh and later on a radio call-in show addressed a rumor that had circulated during Speedweeks as to his health, a rumor revived due to fatigue he'd felt in the win at Dover the previous month.

Slick 50 300 

The Slick 50 300 was held July 9 at New Hampshire International Speedway. Mark Martin won the pole.

Top ten results

 24-Jeff Gordon
 21-Morgan Shepherd
 6-Mark Martin
 5-Terry Labonte
 10-Ricky Rudd
 2-Rusty Wallace
 12-Derrike Cope
 16-Ted Musgrave
 4-Sterling Marlin
 25-Ken Schrader

Failed to qualify: 49-Eric Smith

Miller Genuine Draft 500 

The Miller Genuine Draft 500 was held July 16 at Pocono Raceway. Bill Elliott won the pole.

Top ten results

 28-Dale Jarrett
 24-Jeff Gordon
 10-Ricky Rudd
 16-Ted Musgrave
 94-Bill Elliott
 7-Geoff Bodine
 6-Mark Martin
 98-Jeremy Mayfield
 87-Joe Nemechek
 15-Dick Trickle

Failed to qualify: 14-Randy MacDonald, 82-Terry Byers

This was Dale Jarrett's 1st win with Robert Yates Racing and his only win with the number 28 car.

DieHard 500 

The DieHard 500 was held July 23 at Talladega Superspeedway. Sterling Marlin won the pole. The race was most remembered for Ken Schrader's wild end-over-end tumble in "The Big One" on lap 139, which collected 13 other cars. He was not injured, though.

Top ten results

 4-Sterling Marlin
 28-Dale Jarrett
 3-Dale Earnhardt
 21-Morgan Shepherd
 94-Bill Elliott
 42-Kyle Petty
 6-Mark Martin
 24-Jeff Gordon
 30-Michael Waltrip
 23-Jimmy Spencer, 1 lap down

Failed to qualify: 22-Jimmy Hensley, 0-Delma Cowart, 65-Steve Seligman

Jeff Gordon was very distraught, even in tears, over Ken Schrader's crash because he tapped him to begin the series of events that led to him flipping through the infield grass. He was afraid he had killed his teammate, but Schrader actually got on Gordon's radio after he got out of the infield care center to tell him that he was ok and not to worry about him.

Brickyard 400 

The second Brickyard 400 was held Saturday, August 5, at the Indianapolis Motor Speedway. The popular event returned for a second year, after the tremendous success of the first running. The weekend was expanded by the addition of practice on Wednesday afternoon.

Pole qualifying
Defending champion Jeff Gordon won the pole position on Thursday, August 3, with a track record speed of 172.536 mph. A hot day saw most speeds down, and Gordon was the only driver to break the existing track record. Bobby Hamilton put the fans on their feet when he put the popular Petty #43 STP Pontiac on the outside of the front row with a run of 172.222 mph.

Second round qualifying
On Friday, August 4, the remnants of Hurricane Erin overtook the midwest, and rain settled in for two days. Friday morning practice was lost, and second round qualifying was also rained out. As a result, all cars reverted to their time trials speed from the first round, and the field was filled accordingly. Without a chance in second round qualifying, A. J. Foyt notably failed to qualify, the first time he failed to qualify in a race he attempted at the Indianapolis Motor Speedway since 1958. The field managed a brief "happy hour" practice late Friday evening, and rain began to fall again.

Race recap
On Saturday, August 5, steady rain fell all morning, and threatened to wash out the day. The forecast was marginal for Sunday as well, threatening to washout the whole weekend. Many fans left the grounds as local media speculated (and some erroneously reported) that the race would be postponed. In an unexpected turn of events, at approximately 3:30 p.m. EST (4:30 p.m. EDT), the skies suddenly cleared, and track drying efforts began in earnest. The teams scrambled to get their cars prepared, and the field hastily lined up in the garage area. The Chevrolet C/K pace truck led them on to the track and the race began with many fans still scurrying to their seats. Many of the pit crews were also scrambling to get their equipment set up in the pit area. Some fans driving home on the interstate reportedly turned around and drove back to the track when the radio reported the race was starting.

The green flag dropped at 4:25 p.m. EST (5:25 p.m. EDT) with live coverage only on the radio. ABC-TV had already signed off and by then had decided to air the race on ESPN on tape delay on Sunday afternoon. It stands as one of the last NASCAR races not aired live on television.

Dale Earnhardt beat Rusty Wallace to the finish line in a race slowed by only one caution for 4 laps. Jeff Burton spun off turn two right in front of eventual winner Earnhardt with 27 laps to go. The race was completed at 7:03 p.m. EST (8:03 p.m. EDT), shortly before sunset.

Top ten results

Failed to qualify
44-Jeff Purvis
95-Loy Allen Jr.
66-Billy Standridge
78-Pancho Carter
71-Dave Marcis
65-Steve Seligman
50-A. J. Foyt
80-Joe Ruttman
99-Danny Sullivan
Danny Sullivan's entry was withdrawn after his career-ending crash in the Marlboro 500 at Michigan.

The Bud at The Glen 

The Bud at The Glen was held August 12 at Watkins Glen International. Mark Martin won the pole.

Top ten results

 6-Mark Martin
 22-Wally Dallenbach Jr.
 24-Jeff Gordon
 10-Ricky Rudd
 5-Terry Labonte
 18-Bobby Labonte
 37-John Andretti
 17-Darrell Waltrip
 7-Geoff Bodine
 41-Ricky Craven

Failed to qualify: 61-David Murry, 90-Mike Wallace, 49-Eric Smith

During pre-race ceremonies, all drivers participated in unity for a parade lap to show support for series sponsor R. J. Reynolds. Each driver rode in the back of a pickup truck holding an American flag visible to all spectators. This was done in protest to President Bill Clinton's executive order earlier in the week targeting tobacco advertising at sporting events.
This was Mark Martin's third consecutive win from the pole at Watkins Glen.
Wally Dallenbach Jr., in a one-off "road course ringer" drive for Bill Davis Racing, was leading by almost 10 seconds late in the race. Suffering from headaches and fatigue, from inhaling smoke from an oil leak, Dallenbach Jr. twice got out to huge leads and appeared to be on his way to his first Winston Cup victory. Second place Mark Martin was gaining, but only by about one second per lap. A caution came out for fluid on the track from Joe Nemechek's broken transmission. The green came out with 8 laps to go, and Dallenbach Jr. again got out to a comfy lead. Martin closed the gap, however, and passed Dallenbach Jr. two laps after the restart to claim the win.
Canadian road racing specialist Ron Fellows made his first Cup start in this race in the one-time #68 team owned by Vic Sifton of Canaska Motorsports.
During a rain delay; Mark Martin and Dale Earnhardt were granted the opportunity to run NASCAR's first test of rain tires, running a total of 16 laps during the test period. NASCAR would not use rain tires for a race until the 2020 Bank of America Roval 400.

GM Goodwrench 400 

The GM Goodwrench 400 was held August 19 at Michigan International Speedway. Bobby Labonte won the pole.

Top ten results

 18-Bobby Labonte
 5-Terry Labonte
 24-Jeff Gordon
 4-Sterling Marlin
 2-Rusty Wallace
 31-Ward Burton
 41-Ricky Craven
 43-Bobby Hamilton
 94-Bill Elliott, 1 lap down
 26-Hut Stricklin, 1 lap down

Failed to qualify: 40-Rich Bickle, 72-Tracy Leslie, 02-Tim Steele, 95-Loy Allen Jr.

This was Ward Burton's last race in the #31 Chevrolet for A. G. Dillard Motorsports.

Goody's 500 

The Goody's 500 was held August 26 at Bristol International Raceway. Mark Martin won the pole. 

Top ten results

 5-Terry Labonte
 3-Dale Earnhardt
 28-Dale Jarrett
 17-Darrell Waltrip
 6-Mark Martin
 24-Jeff Gordon
 4-Sterling Marlin
 90-Mike Wallace
 8-Jeff Burton
 12-Derrike Cope, 1 lap down

Failed to qualify: 42-Kyle Petty, 95-Joe Ruttman, 81-Kenny Wallace, 32-Jimmy Hensley, 77-Bobby Hillin Jr., 75-Todd Bodine, 27-Elton Sawyer

This race started roughly an hour and a half to two hours behind schedule due to persistent rains from Tropical Storm Jerry, which had made landfall to the south earlier in the week.
This race is likely the most memorable race of the entire 1995 season due to the infamous finish of the event where Dale Earnhardt ran Terry Labonte down from 3 seconds behind in the late stages of the race and tapped him coming off turn 4 on the last lap. This tap got Labonte loose, and then Labonte overcorrected (slightly grazing the #31 Chevrolet of Greg Sacks in the process). This put Labonte head on into the outside wall just beyond the start-finish line, still ahead of Earnhardt to claim the victory.
Back-to-back seasons that Terry Labonte won 3 races in a season, the most wins in a season in his career. Final time in his career as well that Terry Labonte would win 3 races in a season.
This was Ward Burton's first race in the #22 Pontiac for Bill Davis Racing. However, it was a short debut as Burton crashed out of the race and finished 34th.
Dale Earnhardt was sent to the rear of the field after spinning Rusty Wallace coming out of turn 4 on lap 32. This resulted in an argument between Wallace and Earnhardt after the race where Wallace threw a water bottle at Earnhardt.
Later in the race, Earnhardt ran into the back of Derrike Cope's #12 Ford on a restart. This significantly damaged the front of Earnhardt's car and forced him to pit road for repairs once the caution flag waved again. This was the reason why Earnhardt had to charge through the field in order to catch Terry Labonte at the end of the race.
At one point, the #94 McDonald's Ford of Bill Elliott climbed the wall coming out of turn 2.
The #43 of Bobby Hamilton was given a 5 lap penalty for rough driving for wrecking the #11 Ford of Brett Bodine twice within 20 laps.
Lake Speed suffered from a slight case of smoke inhalation as a result of a crash on lap 390 that broke an oil line on his #9 Ford. The broken oil line (and the accompanying substantial oil leak, which was streaming down the left front fender of the car) caused a fire while Speed was trying to get the car back to his pit stall.

Mountain Dew Southern 500 

The Mountain Dew Southern 500 was held September 3 at Darlington Raceway. The #37 of John Andretti won the pole.

Top ten results

 24-Jeff Gordon
 3-Dale Earnhardt
 2-Rusty Wallace
 22-Ward Burton
 30-Michael Waltrip
 10-Ricky Rudd
 26-Hut Stricklin
 18-Bobby Labonte
 9-Lake Speed
 4-Sterling Marlin

Failed to qualify: 66-Billy Standridge, 52-Brad Teague, 88-Gary Bradberry

Miller Genuine Draft 400 

The Miller Genuine Draft 400 was held September 9 at Richmond International Raceway. Dale Earnhardt won the pole.

Top ten results

 2-Rusty Wallace
 5-Terry Labonte
 3-Dale Earnhardt
 28-Dale Jarrett
 43-Bobby Hamilton
 24-Jeff Gordon
 37-John Andretti, 1 lap down
 10-Ricky Rudd, 1 lap down
 25-Ken Schrader, 1 lap down
 16-Ted Musgrave, 1 lap down

Failed to qualify: 32-Ed Berrier, 78-Jay Hedgecock, 40-Shane Hall, 29-Steve Grissom, 90-Mike Wallace, 49-Eric Smith

Steve Grissom failed to qualify for both Richmond Winston Cup races in 1995.

MBNA 500 

The MBNA 500 was held September 17 at Dover Downs International Speedway. The #1 of Rick Mast won the pole.

Top ten results

 24-Jeff Gordon
 43-Bobby Hamilton
 2-Rusty Wallace
 87-Joe Nemechek
 3-Dale Earnhardt
 4-Sterling Marlin
 12-Derrike Cope, 1 lap down
 6-Mark Martin, 1 lap down
 18-Bobby Labonte, 2 laps down
 10-Ricky Rudd, 2 laps down

Failed to qualify: ??-Billy Standridge, 66-Terry Fisher, 31-Greg Sacks

Rusty Wallace ended up finishing 3rd after being moved to the rear of the field at the beginning of the race due to needing a backup car so that he could run this race.
7th and final win of 1995 for Jeff Gordon.

Goody's 500 

The Goody's 500 was held September 24 at Martinsville Speedway. Qualifying was rained out, so point leader Jeff Gordon was awarded with the pole position.

Top ten results

 3-Dale Earnhardt
 5-Terry Labonte
 2-Rusty Wallace
 43-Bobby Hamilton
 7-Geoff Bodine
 94-Bill Elliott
 24-Jeff Gordon
 17-Darrell Waltrip
 12-Derrike Cope
 28-Dale Jarrett

Failed to qualify: 31-Jimmy Hensley, 32-Greg Sacks, 40-Rich Bickle, 71-Dave Marcis, 77-Bobby Hillin Jr., 81-Kenny Wallace

In the middle part of the race, rookie Robert Pressley's brakes were wearing thin. On the backstretch he touched Ted Musgrave, who was running on seven cylinders, and sent him spinning into the pit wall. The back wheels of the Family Channel Ford climbed on top of the pit wall. This essentially ended Musgrave's title hopes, as he never really regained his earlier season form.

Tyson Holly Farms 400 

The Tyson Holly Farms 400 was held October 1 at North Wilkesboro Speedway. The #16 of Ted Musgrave won the pole.

Top ten results

 6-Mark Martin
 2-Rusty Wallace
 24-Jeff Gordon
 5-Terry Labonte
 10-Ricky Rudd
 88-Ernie Irvan
 28-Dale Jarrett
 25-Ken Schrader, 1 lap down
 3-Dale Earnhardt, 1 lap down
 94-Bill Elliott, 1 lap down

Failed to qualify: 75-Todd Bodine, 32-Greg Sacks, 98-Jeremy Mayfield, 22-Ward Burton, 8-Jeff Burton, 90-Mike Wallace, 78-Jay Hedgecock

This was Ernie Irvan's first race back in the Winston Cup Series since his near-fatal crash in practice at Michigan in August 1994. This resulted in Robert Yates Racing unveiling the #88 in order to give Irvan a car to re-acclimate himself to racing before going full-time in 1996. The 88 car itself would starting in 1996 be run full time by Robert Yates Racing with driver Dale Jarrett.
All 36 cars starting the race finished the event within ten laps of the winner. (Jimmy Spencer was 36th, 10 laps down.) It was the first race since 1959 that an entire starting field finished the race, with no drivers scoring a DNF.
Junior Johnson's final race at his home track as a car owner would see Brett Bodine finish 22nd, 5 laps down; while Elton Sawyer finished 8 laps down in 34th.

UAW-GM Quality 500 

The UAW-GM Quality 500 was held October 8 at Charlotte Motor Speedway. Ricky Rudd won the pole.

Top ten results

 6-Mark Martin
 3-Dale Earnhardt
 5-Terry Labonte
 10-Ricky Rudd
 28-Dale Jarrett
 4-Sterling Marlin
 22-Ward Burton
 18-Bobby Labonte
 2-Rusty Wallace
 43-Bobby Hamilton

Failed to qualify: 97-Chad Little, 81-Kenny Wallace, 44-Jeff Purvis, 0-Delma Cowart, 66-Billy Standridge

Dale Earnhardt took the Past Champion's Provisional to get into this race. Within 70 laps, he was 2nd.

AC Delco 400 

The AC Delco 400 was held October 22 at North Carolina Speedway. The #26 of Hut Stricklin won the pole.

Top ten results

 22-Ward Burton
 2-Rusty Wallace
 6-Mark Martin
 5-Terry Labonte
 8-Jeff Burton
 4-Sterling Marlin
 3-Dale Earnhardt
 41-Ricky Craven
 87-Joe Nemechek
 94-Bill Elliott

Failed to qualify: 71-Dave Marcis, 88-Ernie Irvan, 19-Loy Allen Jr., 78-Jay Hedgecock, 84-Norm Benning, 70-Alan Russell, 14-Richard Brickhouse

This was Ward Burton's first career Winston Cup win, coming in just his seventh race for Bill Davis Racing.
This race featured an unusual 10+ lap long caution due to an error by NASCAR officials pertaining to Dale Earnhardt's car. On a green flag pit stop, Earnhardt's crew changed 4 tires like any other stop. However, one of the lugnuts on the left front tire was not painted red like the rest. As a result, an official called Earnhardt's car back to the pits to fix the problem that didn't actually exist. NASCAR then threw the caution in order to essentially put Earnhardt back where he was before the officials' error occurred, which was more or less unprecedented.

Dura Lube 500 

The Dura Lube 500 was held October 29 at Phoenix International Raceway. The #94 of Bill Elliott won the pole.

Top ten results

 10-Ricky Rudd
 12-Derrike Cope
 3-Dale Earnhardt
 2-Rusty Wallace
 24-Jeff Gordon
 16-Ted Musgrave
 21-Morgan Shepherd
 6-Mark Martin
 1-Rick Mast
 25-Ken Schrader

Failed to qualify: 50-A. J. Foyt, 97-Chad Little, 08-Mike Bliss, 40-Shane Hall, 00w-Scott Gaylord, 58w-Wayne Jacks, 7w-L. J. Pryor, 36w-Rich Woodland Jr.

This victory gave Ricky Rudd a victory in 13 consecutive seasons, dating back to 1983 (when he earned his 1st career victory at Riverside while driving the #3 Piedmont Airlines Chevrolet for Richard Childress).

NAPA 500 

The NAPA 500 was held November 12 at Atlanta Motor Speedway. The #17 of Darrell Waltrip won the pole.

Top ten results

 3-Dale Earnhardt
 4-Sterling Marlin
 2-Rusty Wallace
 94-Bill Elliott
 22-Ward Burton
 23-Jimmy Spencer
 88-Ernie Irvan, 1 lap down
 18-Bobby Labonte, 1 lap down
 77-Bobby Hillin Jr., 1 lap down
 10-Ricky Rudd, 1 lap down

Failed to qualify: 66-Billy Standridge, 59-Jack Sprague, 90-Mike Wallace, 40-Shane Hall, 0-Delma Cowart, 49-Eric Smith

Jeff Gordon came into the race only having to finish 41st or better to win the championship. As a result, he took it easy during the race (at one point, the team did a pit stop with Ray Evernham (Gordon's crew chief) serving as a tire changer). Dale Earnhardt came into this race 147 points behind Gordon. Earnhardt, knowing that he had to be near perfect to win the championship, went all out with nothing to lose. However, he went on to win the race and lead the most laps. He led 268 of the 328 laps. Gordon led only one lap, and that was during a round of green flag pit stops. With Earnhardt's win and leading the most laps (10 bonus points for leading the most laps), and with Gordon finishing 14 laps down in 32nd place, along with the 5 bonus points for leading a lap, Earnhardt gained a total of 113 points on Gordon. However, it was not enough for him to win a series record 8th championship. Gordon officially won his 1st title by 34 points over Earnhardt.
Hendrick Motorsports entered a fourth car just for this race just in case the unforeseen were to hit Gordon's car. If problems were to befall Gordon's car, the car would immediately pull off the track and retire from the race. This was the #58 Pontiac with "Racing for a Reason" on the quarter panels. Racing for a Reason referred to finding a cure for leukemia, a disease that owner Rick Hendrick had been diagnosed with. The team had originally hired Jimmy Horton to drive the car in the race. Horton qualified the car in 34th, but was unable to race it due to serious injuries suffered in a terrible crash in the ARCA Bondo Mar-Hyde Series support race the day before the NAPA 500. Jeff Purvis was then hired to sub for Horton in the #58 and drove the car to a 26th-place finish, 8 laps down.
Final race for King Racing, owned by drag racing legend Kenny Bernstein.
Last career pole for Darrell Waltrip.
Final race for Junior Johnson & Associates; as Johnson would sell the #11 car to its driver, Brett Bodine, while the #27 would go to attorney David Blair.
Last Top 10 finish for Bobby Hillin Jr.

Final points standings 

(key) Bold - Pole position awarded by time. Italics - Pole position set by owner's points standings. *- Most laps led.

Rookie of the Year 
29-year-old Ricky Craven from Newburgh, Maine received the 1995 Rookie of the Year award. Craven took the #41 Chevy owned by Sue and Larry Hedrick to four top-tens and finished 24th in the points. Runner-up was Craven's former Busch Series opponent Robert Pressley, posting one top-ten in the Leo Jackson Motorsports Chevy. The next runner-up, Randy LaJoie, began the year in the 22 car, but struggled and was released midway through the year. Steve Kinser and Davy Jones, a pair of open-wheel veterans who struggled in their transition to stock cars, were both released from their rides before the season reached the one-third point, while Mike Chase was released by his team after failing to qualify for the Daytona 500. Gary Bradberry and Terry Byers filed for Rookie of the Year contention but only ran limited schedules.

See also
1994–95 NASCAR SuperTruck Series exhibition races
1995 NASCAR Busch Series
1995 NASCAR SuperTruck Series

External links 
Winston Cup Standings and Statistics 1995 

 
NASCAR Cup Series seasons